May Myint Mo (born May Myint Mo Aung 11 May 1995) is a Burmese television and film actress. She gained widespread popularity after starring in the MRTV-4 series Pan Nu Thway (2013) and A Yake (2018).

Early life and education
May Myint Mo was born on 11 May 1995 in Yangon, Myanmar to parent Aung Ko and his wife Myintzu Htut. She has one younger sibling Shinn Myat, an actor. She attended high school at Basic Education High School No. 1 Dagon and graduated from the University of Yangon in 2016 with an LLB degree.

Career

2012–2014: Acting debut and recognition
May began her modeling career in 2012 while a student. She also appeared on music videos, magazine cover photos and as commercial model for many advertisements. She made her acting debut with in the third season of The Sign of Love, after being selected by Forever Group, from among almost 100 amateur actresses.

In 2013, she starred in her second television drama Pan Nu Thway where she played the leading role with Myat Thu Kyaw, aired on MRTV-4 in 2013, and received positive reviews for her portrayal of Pan Nu Thway, which led to increased popularity for her. She then starred in the season 2 of Pan Nu Thway, aired on MRTV-4 in 2014.

2014–2015: Breaking into the big screen
In 2014, she took on her first big-screen role in the historical film Magical Inscription where she played the main role with Myint Myat, Tun Tun, and Shwe Hmone Yati, which premiered in Myanmar cinemas on 5 October 2018. In 2015, she portrayed the female lead in the film Moe Pann Pwint Yae Thin-Kay-Ta (The Sign of Sky Flower), alongside Han Lin Thant, which premiered in Myanmar cinemas on 14 September 2018.

2016–present: Major roles and rising popularity
In 2016, she co-starred with Sithu Win and Aung Yay Chan in the historical drama Sone See Chin Moe Tain Myar, portrayed the role of Ngwe Lamin, alongside, aired on MRTV-4 in 2017. In 2017, she gain increased attention and popularity with her role as Su Su Hlaing in the hit drama A Yake (Shadow) alongside Hein Htet, Net Khat, Yan Aung, Soe Myat Thuzar, aired on MRTV-4 in May 2018, was a huge success, topping television ratings and becoming the most watched Burmese television drama at that time. May's portrayal of the character earned praised by fans for her acting performance and character interpretation, and experienced a resurgence of popularity. The series is adapted from Ma Sandar's novel A Yake (The Shadow) and a remake of the popular 1997 film A Yake based on the same novel.

In 2018, she starred in the historical drama Bagan Myo Thu alongside Daung and Htoo Aung, aired on MRTV-4 on 28 November 2018. The series is directed by Kyaw Thu and adapted from Mg Thein Sine's novel Bagan Myo Thu. She won the "Rising Star Award (Female)" at the 2018 Star Awards for her performance in the film Moe Pann Pwint Yae Thin-Kay-Ta.

In 2019, she starred in the thriller drama series The Missing Truth alongside Lu Min, Kaung Myat San, Htoo Aung, Aung Ye Htike aired on MRTV-4 on 19 September 2019.

In 2020, she starred in the military series Legends of Warriors with Kyaw Hsu, Aung Yay Chan, Soe Myat Thuzar which aired on MRTV-4 on 13 March 2020.

Filmography

Film (Cinema)
Mhaw Kyauk Sar (မှော်ကျောက်စာ) (2018)
Sign of Moe Pan Pwint (မိုးပန်းပွင့်ရဲ့သင်္ကေတ) (2018)
A Chit Sone Crush? (2019)
1014 (၁၀၁၄) (2019)
Kyauk Kyauk Kyauk 2 (ကြောက်ကြောက်ကြောက်၂) (2019)
Yoma Paw Kya Tae Myet Yay (ရိုးမပေါ်ကျတဲ့မျက်ရည်) (2019) 
Calling (ခေါ်သံ) TBA
Vein Of Love (စတုတ္ထြေမာက်သွေးကြောမျှင်) TBA
Blood Debt (သွေးကြွေး) TBA

Television series
The Sign of Love: Season 3 (2013)
Pan Nu Thway: Season 1 (2013)
Pan Nu Thway: Season 2 (2015)
Sone See Chin Moe Tain Myar (2017)
A Yake (2018)
Bagan Myo Thu (2018)
The Missing Truth (2019)
Legends of Warriors (2020)

Awards and nominations

References

External links
 
 

Living people
1995 births
21st-century Burmese actresses
University of Yangon alumni
Burmese film actresses